Events in the year 1918 in Portugal.

Incumbents

President: Sidónio Pais until 14 December; João do Canto e Castro
Prime Minister: Sidónio Bernardino Cardoso da Silva Pais; João do Canto e Castro; João Tamagnini de Sousa Barbosa

Events
28 April – Portuguese general election, 1918.
14 October – Action of 14 October 1918
The Portuguese Maximalist Federation founded
Establishment of the National Republican Party.

Arts and entertainment
The D. Diogo de Sousa Museum established

Sports
19 March – C.D. Feirense founded

Births

Deaths
14 May – Joaquim Pimenta de Castro, military officer, mathematician and politician (born 1846)
14 October - Carvalho Araújo
14 December – Sidónio Pais, politician and diplomat (born 1872)

References

 
1910s in Portugal
Years of the 20th century in Portugal
Portugal